Pooja (Worship) is a 1940 Indian Hindi/Urdu-language psychological drama film directed by A. R. Kardar. The music director was Anil Biswas, with lyrics by Khan Shatir Ghaznavi. Produced by National Studios, the story, screenplay and dialogue writer was M. Sadiq and the cinematographer was P. G. Kukde. The film starred Sardar Akhtar, Zahur Raja, Sitara Devi, Jyoti, Sankatha Prasad, Sunalini Devi, Bhudo Advani and Baby Meena (Meena Kumari).

The story involves two sisters, Rama and Lachhi. The younger sister Lachhi, is raped by the rejected suitor of the other sister and gets pregnant. The film then follows the child being brought up by Rama while the real mother, Lachhi, works as a maid in the same house.

Plot

Two sisters Rama (Sardar Akhtar) and Lachhi (Sitara Devi) spend their time teasing each other. Rama's marriage is fixed with Darpan (Zahur Raja). However, the marriage is called off and Rama is married off to someone else. Unable to bear the humiliation, Darpan supposedly rapes Lachhi, as it's not made clear whether she was a willing partner. In the meantime, Rama's husband dies and she is now living a widowed life. When its learnt that Lachhi is pregnant, Rama takes her in and brings up Bina (Baby Meena) as her own daughter. Bina assumes Lachhi is just a maid working in her house. Much later, Bina finds out the truth about Lachhi being her mother.

Cast
 Sardar Akhtar as Rama
 Zahur Raja as Darpan
 Sitara Devi as Lachhi
 Baby Meena as Bina
 Kanhaiyalal
Bhudo Advani
 Sankatha Prasad
 Sunalini Devi
 Sayani Atish
 Satish
 Amir Bano

Production

Pooja deals with the "shattering consequences of feudal sexual codes".
Kardar was interested in themes involving "sexual abnormality". He had earlier used the idea in his film Pagal, which dealt with a "psychotic doctor" given to sexual obsession.

Sitara's role of the unwed mother in the film was appreciated.

Soundtrack
The music director was Anil Biswas, while the lyricist was Shatir Ghaznavi. The singers were Sitara Devi, Sardar Akhtar, Zahur Raja, Jyoti, Tara Harish and Anil Biswas.

Song List

References

External links
 

1940 films
1940s Hindi-language films
Films directed by A. R. Kardar
Indian drama films
1940 drama films
Indian black-and-white films
Hindi-language drama films